Jan Lake is a resort community on the Hanson Lake Road, Saskatchewan, on the shore of the lake with the same name. The community has a Canadian Coast Guard wharf, provincial and private campgrounds, pubs, as well as many tourist lodges, which focus on fishing, camping, and private cabins.

Game fish include walleye, Northern pike, and yellow perch. 
The best months for fishing are May, June, and September.

See also 
List of communities in Saskatchewan

References

Unincorporated communities in Saskatchewan